Ipidecla schausi, also called Schaus' hairstreak or Salvin's dwarf, is a small butterfly in the family Lycaenidae, sub-family Theclinae and genus Ipidecla.

Taxonomy
Ipidecla schausi was first described by Frederick DuCane Godman and Osbert Salvin in 1887, under the name Thecla schausi (in Mexico), Thecla insignis (in Panama) and Thecla miranda (in Brazil). It had separately been described as Ipidecla euprepes by Hayward in 1949 (in Argentina).

Description
The top of the male is beige gray very largely suffused with light blue metallic, that of the female is beige, veined with brown.

The reverse in the male is gray veined with black, adorned with a red spot in the basal area of the anterior and posterior wings. In the female, the reverse is yellow veined with black;

Ecology and distribution
Ipidecla schausi is present in America in three isolates in Mexico and Panama, in Argentina and Paraguay, and in Peru, Brazil and Guyana.

Biotope
Ipidecla schausi lives in humid tropical forests.

See also

 Lepidoptera
 Lycaenidae
 List of butterflies of French Guiana

Further reading
 Lépidoptères de Guyane, Lépidoptéristes de France, tome V,

References

Eumaeini
Lepidoptera of Guyana
Taxa named by Frederick DuCane Godman
Taxa named by Osbert Salvin